Jawahar Navodaya Vidyalaya, Malappuram or locally known as Navodaya School is a boarding, co-educational school in Malappuram of Kerala state in India. Navodaya Vidyalayas are funded by the Indian Ministry of Human Resources Development and administered  by Navodaya Vidyalaya Smiti, an autonomous body under the ministry.

History 
The school was established in 1988, and is a part of Jawahar Navodaya Vidyalaya schools. This school's permanent campus is located at Oorakam Village bordering Malappuram Municipality. This school is administered and monitored by Hyderabad regional office of Navodaya Vidyalaya Smiti.

Facilities
JNV Malappuram campus has 13.71 acres of land which consists 9 houses, 5 boys and 4 girls houses for the strength of 248 boys and 250 girls total 498. There is a spacious ground for sports and other activities. Facilities for Table Tennis, Judo, Chess, Badminton etc are also available.

How to reach
JNV Malappuram is roughly 15 minute drive away from Malappuram Town Center via Malappuram - Parappanangadi State Highway.

Admission 
Admission to JNV Malappuram at class VI level is made through selection test conducted by Navodaya Vidyalaya Smiti. The information about test is disseminated and advertised in the district by the office of Malappuram district magistrate (Collector), who is also the chairperson of Vidyalya Management Committee.

Affiliations 
JNV Malappuram is affiliated to Central Board of Secondary Education with affiliation number 940011, following the curriculum prescribed by CBSE.

See also 

 List of JNV schools
 List of Kendriya Vidyalayas
 Odisha Adarsha Vidyalaya - Emulation of the Navodaya Vidyalaya system

References

External links 

 Official website of JNV Malappuram

High schools and secondary schools in Kerala
Malappuram
Educational institutions established in 1988
1988 establishments in Kerala
Malappuram district